Jeff Martin may refer to:

Jeff Martin (American musician) (born 1957), lead vocalist for the bands Surgical Steel and Racer X; drummer for Badlands
Jeff Martin (Canadian musician) (born 1969), guitarist, singer, and songwriter for the Tea Party
Jeff Martin (basketball) (born 1967), former player for the Los Angeles Clippers
Jeff Martin (game designer) (born 1965), founder of True Adventures company and president of Dwarven Forge
Jeff Martin (writer), on The Simpsons
Jeff Martin (tenor), American operatic tenor
Jeff Martin, lead vocalist for the American band Idaho
Jeff Martin (All My Children), fictional character on All My Children

See also
Geoff Martin (disambiguation)
Geoffrey Martin (disambiguation)